Pohang University of Science and Technology (POSTECH) is a private research university in Pohang, South Korea.

History
POSTECH was established in 1986 in Pohang, Korea by POSCO, a steel company.

POSTECH hosted POSCO's Research Institute of Science and Technology (RIST) on campus.  In 1994, POSTECH set up the Pohang Accelerator Laboratory (PAL), a 3rd-generation synchrotron light source and now a national facility. PAL-XFEL, a 4th-generation light source X-ray free electron laser (XFEL) was completed in 2016 at the cost of US$390 million, the third of its kind in the world, and will open up new frontiers and research areas in life sciences, materials, chemistry, and physics.

Timeline

Presidents

University rankings 

In 1998, POSTECH was ranked by Asiaweek as the best science and technology university in Asia. From 2002 to 2006 JoongAng Ilbo ranked POSTECH as the leading university in Korea. In 2010, the Times Higher Education ranked POSTECH 28th in the world. In 2011, the Times Higher Education ranked the university as the 53rd best university in the world, the 6th best in Asia, and the best in South Korea. In 2017–2018, QS World University Rankings ranked POSTECH 71st overall in the world. It remains third best ranked in Korea, after Seoul National University and KAIST, in the QS Asian University Rankings. However, in the Times Higher Education rankings, it scored highly after compilers placed less emphasis on "reputation and heritage" and gave more weight to objective measures including the influence of universities' research, placing 53rd. In 2012 and 2013, the Times Higher Education ranked POSTECH 1st in its "100 Under 50 Young Universities" rankings. The New York Times  and the International Herald Tribune cited POSTECH's rapid ascent as a young university to top the world rankings in less than 50 years.

Campus
POSTECH is a 400-acre campus located twenty minutes by car from downtown Pohang, an hour by bus from Busan, and approximately two and half hours by train (KTX) from Seoul.

Tae-Joon Park Digital Library
Completed in 2003, the Tae-Joon Park Library is 24,420 square meters with 352,977 volumes and 8,324 digital and paper journals. As of 2005, the library collection consists of approximately 320,000 books, 3,500 journals, 7,000 e-journals 25 databases, and 4,400 multimedia materials. The Library shares materials with industrial-educational-research cooperation and is part of an intercollegiate data exchange program with approximately 150 other research and educational institutions throughout the nation.

Smart campus
In 2010, for the first time among Korean universities, POSTECH implemented a Desktop Cloud Service. However, many of the previously implemented technological services (e.g. campus smartphone applications, university website, university online portal, etc.) are defective as they have not been since updated.

Academics

Admissions
POSTECH admits approximately 300 undergraduate students each year. POSTECH received 1,987 applicants for freshman admission and admitted 323 for the 2014 school year. POSTECH provides the highest educational investment and the most per-student scholarship support in Korea, allowing students from all economic backgrounds the opportunity to obtain a POSTECH education.

Research

The 4th generation light source (PAL-XFEL), which has been operational since 2015, is 10 billion times brighter than the 3rd generation light source.

References

External links 

 Official site

 
Technical universities and colleges
Universities and colleges in North Gyeongsang Province
Pohang
Engineering universities and colleges in South Korea
1986 establishments in South Korea
Educational institutions established in 1986
Institute for Basic Science
Private universities and colleges in South Korea